Caleb Alan Wyatt (born January 1, 1976) is the first person to ever perform a successful backflip on a large motorcycle.  On April 25, 2002 at the Rogue Valley Motocross track (RVMX), Caleb .  A photo of Caleb was taken by the RVMX track owner to document the event.

Caleb Wyatt's first successful backflips were performed over a mulch pile of grass clipping, leaves and bark which was originally intended for the maintenance of the RVMX track.  Wyatt constructed a quarter pipe ramp with the take-off completely vertical that launched to a step up.

Caleb has since performed this Freestyle Motocross (FMX) trick hundreds of times around the United States.  On January 25, 2004, Caleb became the Moto X Best Trick Gold Metal winner during the 8th Winter X-Games when he bested the competition with a 90 foot gap no-hander backflip.

External links
 Caleb's website

1976 births
Living people
American motorsport people